The 2022 FIVB Volleyball Men's Club World Championship was the 17th edition of the competition. It was held in Betim, Brazil. It was the seventh time as well as the third consecutive times Betim was selected as the host city. The tournament was held from 7 to 11 December 2022. It was Volei Renata's first appearance at the Club World Championship.

Sir Safety Susa Perugia won their title for the first time on their first participation of the tournament. Simone Giannelli was chosen as MVP of this tournament.

Host selection
On 10 June 2022 Brazilian media reported that this edition of the men's club world championship would be hosted in Minas Gerais, Brazil. According to the report, Brazil is going to host both men's and women's club world championship. 

Later on 13 September 2022 it was reported that the Italian club Perugia had offered to host the next edition of the men's club world championship. 
In the end, Betim was selected to be the host city.

Qualification

1.ZAKSA Kędzierzyn-Koźle withdrew from the tournament again and replaced by Sir Safety Susa Perugia.
2.Sada Cruzeiro Vôlei is granted with a hosts spot. Therefore, Vôlei Renata, the third placed team from the 2022 CSV Club Championship is qualified as the next eligible team through the continental club championship qualification pathway in accordance with the FIVB event regulations.

Venue

Format

Preliminary round
Six teams divided into two pools of three teams each in a round-robin match. The top two teams of each pool advance to the semifinals.

Final round
A knockout stage. The first ranked team of Pool A plays a semifinal match against the second ranked team of Pool B, and the first ranked team of Pool B plays a semifinal match against the second ranked team of Pool A. The winners of the semifinals play for the Club World Championship title, while the runners-up play for the third place in the competition.

Pools composition

Squads

Pool standing procedure
 Number of victories
 Match points
 Sets quotient
 Points quotient
 Result of the last match between the tied teams

Match won 3–0 or 3–1: 3 match points for the winner, 0 match points for the loser
Match won 3–2: 2 match points for the winner, 1 match point for the loser

Preliminary round
All times are Brasília Time (UTC−03:00).

Pool A

|}

|}

Pool B

|}

|}

Final round
All times are Brasília Time (UTC−03:00).

Semifinals
|}

3rd place match
|}

Final
|}

Final standings

Awards

Most Valuable Player
 Simone Giannelli (Sir Safety Susa Perugia)
Best Setter
 Simone Giannelli (Sir Safety Susa Perugia)
Best Outside Spikers
 Alessandro Michieletto (Trentino Itas)
 Wilfredo León (Sir Safety Susa Perugia)

Best Middle Blockers
 Marko Podraščanin (Trentino Itas)
 Flávio Gualberto (Sir Safety Susa Perugia)
Best Opposite Spiker
 Matey Kaziyski (Trentino Itas)
Best Libero
 Lucas De Deus (Sada Cruzeiro Vôlei)

See also
2022 FIVB Volleyball Women's Club World Championship

References

External links
Official website

FIVB Volleyball Men's Club World Championship
FIVB
FIVB
2022 FIVB Men's Club World Championship
FIVB